Llanthony Priory is a partly ruined former Augustinian priory in the secluded Vale of Ewyas,  a steep-sided once-glaciated valley within the Black Mountains area of the Brecon Beacons National Park in Monmouthshire, south east Wales. It lies seven miles north of Abergavenny on an old road to Hay-on-Wye at Llanthony. The priory ruins lie to the west of the prominent Hatterrall Ridge, a limb of the Black mountains. The main ruins are under the care of Cadw and entrance is free.

The priory is a Grade I listed building as of  1 September 1956. Within the precincts of the Priory are three other buildings with Grade I listed status: the Abbey Hotel, listed on 1 September 1956; St David's Church, listed on the same date, and Court Farm Barn, listed on 9 January in the same year.

History

Foundation
The priory dates back to around the year 1100, when one of Hugh de Lacy's knights called William reputedly came upon a ruined chapel of St. David in this location, and was inspired to devote himself to solitary prayer and study.  He was joined by Ersinius, a former Chaplain to Queen Matilda, the wife of King Henry I, and then a band of followers. A church was built on the site, dedicated to St John the Baptist, and consecrated in 1108.  By 1118, a group of around 40 canons founded there a priory of Canons Regular, the first in Wales.

In 1135, after persistent attacks from the local Welsh population, the monks retreated to Gloucester where they founded a secondary cell, Llanthony Secunda.  However, around 1186 another member of the de Lacy family, Hugh, the fifth baron, endowed the estate with funds from his Irish estates to rebuild the priory church, and this work was completed by 1217.  There are also letters from Pope Clement III (CSM,i,p. 157–159), between 1185 and 1188, confirming further grants and gifts to the priory from Adam de Feypo and Geoffrey de Cusack in Ireland.

The Priory became one of the great medieval buildings in Wales, in a mixture of Norman and Gothic architectural styles.   Renewed building took place around 1325, with a new gatehouse.  On Palm Sunday, April 4, 1327, the deposed Edward II stayed at the Priory on his way from Kenilworth Castle to Berkeley Castle, where he is alleged to have been murdered.

Dissolution
Following Owain Glyndŵr's rebellion in the early 15th century, the Priory seems to have been barely functioning.  In 1481 it was formally merged with its daughter cell in Gloucester, and after 1538 both houses were suppressed by Henry VIII's Dissolution of the Monasteries.

The 18th and 19th centuries

The buildings at Llanthony gradually decayed after the Dissolution to a ruin, although in the early 18th century the medieval infirmary was converted to the Church of St David.  In 1799 the estate was bought by Colonel Sir Mark Wood, the owner of Piercefield House near Chepstow, who converted some of the buildings into a domestic house and shooting box. He then sold the estate in 1807 to the poet Walter Savage Landor.

Landor needed an Act of Parliament, passed in 1809, to be allowed to pull down some of Wood's buildings and construct a house, which was never finished. He wanted to become a model country gentleman, planting trees, importing sheep from Spain, and improving the roads. There is still an avenue of trees in the area known as "Landor's Larches" and many old chestnuts have been dated back to his time.

Landor described the idylls of country life, including the nightingales and glow-worms in the valley to his friend Robert Southey. However the idyll was not to last long as for the next three years Landor was worried by the combined vexation of neighbours and tenants, lawyers and lords-lieutenant and even the Bishop of St David's. Many of his troubles stemmed from petty squabbles, arising from his headstrong and impetuous nature. He wasted money trying to improve the land, and the condition of the poorer inhabitants. The final straw was when he let his farmland to one Charles Betham whom Landor viewed as incompetent and extravagant and who paid no rent. After an expensive action to recover the debts from Betham, Landor had had enough, and decided to leave the country, abandoning Llanthony to his creditors – principally his mother. The estate was administered in his absence by his mother and cousin, but many of the buildings continued to disintegrate thereafter.

In 1869, Joseph Leycester Lyne (known as Father Ignatius) founded an Anglican monastic institution in nearby Capel-y-ffin which he named Llanthony Abbey.  It survived until 1908, and its buildings were later the home of artist Eric Gill.

Later history
The ruins have attracted artists over the years, including J. M. W. Turner who painted them from the opposite hillside. The priory was acquired by the Knight family in the 20th century.

Wood's house later became the Abbey Hotel. The remaining ruins are protected by Cadw and entrance to the ruins is free.

See also
List of abbeys and priories in Wales
William de Wycumbe

Notes

References
 
J. Newman (2000) The Buildings of Wales – Gwent / Monmouthshire

External links

Llanthony Priory in the Vale of Ewyas: the landscape impact of a medieval Priory in the Welsh Marches
 Description of Llanthony in the 12th century by Giraldus Cambrensis

Grade I listed churches in Monmouthshire
Buildings and structures in Monmouthshire
Scheduled monuments in Monmouthshire
Augustinian monasteries in Wales
Medieval Wales
Black Mountains, Wales
1100s establishments in Wales
Christian monasteries established in the 12th century
Tourist attractions in Monmouthshire
Ruins in Wales
12th-century establishments in Wales
1538 disestablishments in Europe
Cadw
Grade I listed monasteries
Monasteries dissolved under the English Reformation